Claude Rutault (25 October 1941 – 27 May 2022) was a French painter. He was born at Les Trois-Moutiers and died in Boulogne-Billancourt.

He was diagnosed with Alzheimer's disease in 2020, though no cause of death was given. He was known for not working on any of his paintings in any manner but rather having them created by a care-taker.

References

1941 births
2022 deaths
French painters
People from Vienne